James Oscar Davis III (born October 11, 1957) is an American politician from the U.S. state of Florida. He is a Democrat and served in the U.S. House of Representatives from 1997 to 2007, representing Florida's 11th congressional district. He was the Democratic nominee for governor of Florida in the 2006 election, but was defeated by Republican Charlie Crist.

Early life and education

Davis was born in Tampa, Florida. He graduated from Jesuit High School of Tampa in 1975, and attended Washington and Lee University, where he received his Bachelor of Arts degree in 1979. He later attended the University of Florida's College of Law, received his Juris Doctor in 1982. He later credited his grandfather as an important influence on his life.

Career
Davis worked as a lawyer in private practice from 1982 to 1988, when he became a partner in the Tampa-based business law firm of Bush, Ross, Gardner, Warren & Rudy. Davis was elected to the Florida House of Representatives in 1989 and served until 1996, serving as House Majority Leader from 1995 to 1996.

US House
Davis entered the race for the Tampa-based 11th District in 1996, after Sam Gibbons—the district's only congressman since its creation in 1963—announced his retirement.  Although Gibbons had endorsed Davis as his successor, Davis finished second in a four-way Democratic primary behind former Tampa mayor Sandy Freedman.  He won the runoff with 56 percent of the vote.
 
He faced Republican Mark Sharpe in the general election.  The race was initially thought to be close, especially since Sharpe had nearly defeated Gibbons in 1994 and held him to 52 percent in 1992.  However, Davis won by a convincing 15-point margin, largely due to Bill Clinton carrying the district.  After defeating an underfunded Republican in 1998, Davis faced only a Libertarian candidate in 2000 and 2004 and was completely unopposed in 2002.

Davis was one of the co-chairs of the New Democrat Coalition in the House of Representatives. The New Democrat Coalition is affiliated with the centrist Democratic Leadership Council.

On October 10, 2002, Jim Davis was among the 81 House Democrats who voted in favor of authorizing the invasion of Iraq.

2006 gubernatorial campaign

Davis announced his candidacy for governor of Florida in 2005 and won the Democratic primary held on September 5, 2006. He defeated then-state Senator Rod Smith by a margin of 46 percent to 42 percent.

He received the endorsements of former U.S. President Bill Clinton, U.S. senator for Florida Bill Nelson, U.S. senator for Illinois Barack Obama, former Governor and U.S. Senator Bob Graham, former Governor Buddy MacKay, former First Lady Rhea Chiles (wife of Lawton Chiles), former Tallahassee mayor and Florida Democratic Party chairman Scott Maddox, Miami-Dade Democratic Party chairman Jimmy Morales, and Representatives Alcee Hastings, Robert Wexler, Corrine Brown, and Debbie Wasserman Schultz.

He lost the race to Attorney General Charlie Crist by a margin of 52–45.

Post-political career
, Davis is employed at Holland & Knight in Tampa. In 2010, Davis has been a member of and public speaker for Moving Hillsborough Forward, an organization formed to help pass a transit tax referendum on the 2010 general election ballot in Hillsborough County.

In 2010, Davis was a member of and public speaker for Moving Hillsborough Forward, an organization formed to help pass a transit tax referendum on the general election ballot in Hillsborough County. Though there was some speculation that he might potentially run for Mayor of Tampa in 2011, he ultimately declined to run. Though then-Mayor Pam Iorio declared that Davis would be an "excellent" successor, it was speculated that the defeat of the rail referendum by voters left Davis with no platform to run for Mayor on. Davis is a member of the ReFormers Caucus of Issue One.

Electoral history

{| class="wikitable" style="margin:0.5em ; font-size:95%"
|+ : Results 1996–2006
!|Year
!
!|Democrat
!|Votes
!|Pct
!
!|Republican
!|Votes
!|Pct
!
!|3rd Party
!|Party
!|Votes
!|Pct
!
|-
|1996
|
| |
| align="right" |108,522
| |57.9%
|
| |Mark Sharpe
| align="right" |78,881
| |42.1%
| 
|
|
|
|
|
|-
|1998
|
| |Jim Davis
| align="right" |85,262
| |64.9%
|
| |Joe Chillura
| align="right" |46,176
| |35.1%
|
|
|
|
|
|
|-
|2000
|
| |Jim Davis
| align="right" |149,433
| |84.6%
|
| |(no candidate)
| align="right" |
| |
|
| |Charlie Westlake
| |Libertarian
| align="right" |27,194
| align="right" |15.4%
|
|-
|2002
|
| |Jim Davis
| align="right" |Unopposed
| |100%
|
| |(no candidate)
| align="right" |
| |
|
|
|
|
|
|
|-
|2004
|
| |Jim Davis
| align="right" |191,780
| |85.8%
|
| |(no candidate)
| align="right" |
| |
|
| |Robert Edward Johnson
| |Libertarian
| align="right" |31,579
| align="right" |14.1%
|

Personal life
Davis's wife is Peggy Bessent Davis. The couple have two children, Peter and William. He is a member of the Episcopal Church.

References

External links

Biography from Project Vote Smart
Voting record maintained by the Washington Post
Jim Davis Papers at the University of South Florida
 

|-

|-

|-

|-

|-

1957 births
Living people
21st-century American politicians
American Episcopalians
Fredric G. Levin College of Law alumni
Holland & Knight people
Democratic Party members of the United States House of Representatives from Florida
Jesuit High School (Tampa) alumni
Democratic Party members of the Florida House of Representatives
Politicians from Tampa, Florida
Washington and Lee University alumni
Members of Congress who became lobbyists